Pancratium is a genus of African and Eurasian perennial, herbaceous and bulbous plants in the Amaryllis family, subfamily Amaryllidoideae

The flowers are large, white and fragrant. The perianth tube and the corona are present. It differs from the similar Hymenocallis in its numerous seeds with a thin black skin. Plants belonging to the genus Pancratium have been found in prehistoric Cretan frescoes.

The name "Pancratium" is derived from the Greek and means "all-strength", probably referring to the strength of a plant that can tolerate extreme climates. Pancratium species often inhabit extremely dry and sandy areas.

Species
Many species have been published using the name Pancratium, but most have been transferred to other genera (Clinanthus Hymenocallis Ismene Proiphys Stenomesson). Only a few species are cultivated. P. maritimum and P. illyricum being the hardiest for outdoor cultivation, but shy flowering in cool areas. P. zeylanicum is sometimes grown as a hothouse container plant.

, the World Checklist of Selected Plant Families accepted 21 species in the genus:

Pancratium arabicum Sickenb. - Egypt incl Sinai
Pancratium biflorum Roxb. - India, Bangladesh, Sri Lanka, Hong Kong
Pancratium canariense Ker Gawl. - Canary Islands
Pancratium centrale (A.Chev.) Traub - Cameroon, Chad, Ethiopia, Central African Rep
Pancratium donaldii Blatt. - India
Pancratium foetidum Pomel - Morocco, Algeria, Tunisia, Libya
Pancratium illyricum L. - Corsica, Sardinia, Capri
Pancratium landesii Traub - Oman
Pancratium longiflorum Roxb. ex Ker Gawl. - India
Pancratium maritimum L. - Canary Islands, Mediterranean, Caucasus
Pancratium maximum Forssk. - Sudan, Saudi Arabia, Yemen, Oman
Pancratium parvicoronatum Geerinck - Zaïre to Malawi
Pancratium parvum Dalzell - India
Pancratium sickenbergeri Asch. & Schweinf. - Egypt incl Sinai, Israel, Palestinian Territories, Lebanon, Jordan, Syria, Saudi Arabia
Pancratium st-mariae Blatt. & Hallb. - India
Pancratium tenuifolium Hochst. ex A.Rich. - tropical + southern Africa
Pancratium tortuosum Herb. - Egypt, Eritrea, Sudan, Saudi Arabia
Pancratium trianthum Herb. - Sahara, Sahel
Pancratium triflorum Roxb. - India, Bangladesh
Pancratium verecundum Aiton - Himalayas
Pancratium zeylanicum L. - India (incl Lakshadweep), Maldives, Sri Lanka, Borneo, Java, Sulawesi, Philippines, Maluku

References

External links

Amaryllidaceae genera